Esther Fussell Lewis (March 18, 1782 – February 8, 1848) was an American Quaker abolitionist, Underground Railroad conductor and station master, farmer, school founder, teacher, and nurse.

Lewis managed her family farm near Kimberton, Chester County, Pennsylvania.

She was a conductor of the north-south line of the Underground Railroad through Pennsylvania.

Early life and education 
Esther Fussell was born on March 18, 1782, in Hatboro, Pennsylvania, to Quaker minister Reverend Bartholomew Fussell and Rebekah or Rebecca Bond. She had seven siblings: Bartholomew, Solomon, Rebecca, Joseph, Jacob, Sarah, and William.

Lewis wanted to be a doctor, but found difficulty attaining a professional education due to being a woman.

Lewis would record observations of solar and lunar eclipses and the appearance of comets and meteors, and kept a weather and plant-blooming diary.

Personal life and family 
On September 10, 1818, Esther Fussell married John Lewis. They had four children: Elizabeth R. (1824–1863), Graceanna Lewis (1821-1912), Mariann (1819–1866), and Rebecca (1820–1893).

Participation in the Underground Railroad 
Lewis taught her children to be abolitionists, as their home was a “station” on the Underground Railroad.

Their home functioned as “a rehabilitation center for fugitives,” and they burned the clothes worn by people who were enslaved on southern plantations. Lewis’s children continued this work after her death.

References

External links 

 Finding Aid for the Lewis-Fussell Family Papers held at Swathmore College Friends Historical Library.
 Memoir of Esther Fussell Lewis, likely written by her daughter, Graceanna Lewis. (A00185757) From the Lewis-Fussell Family Papers SFHL-RG5-087
 Graceanna Lewis letter to Esther Fussell Lewis. (A00179477) From the Lewis-Fussell Family Papers SFHL-RG5-087
Esther Fussell Lewis writings and letters from the Lewis-Fussell Family papers 

1782 births
1848 deaths
People from Hatboro, Pennsylvania
American abolitionists
Underground Railroad in Pennsylvania
Abolitionism in North America
History of Pennsylvania
19th century in Pennsylvania